Ramnagar is a village in the southern state of Karnataka, India. It is situated in Afzalpur Taluk of Kalaburagi.

Demographics

2011

References

Villages in Kalaburagi district